This article shows statistics of individual players and lists all matches that Dinamo Zagreb will play in the 2011–12 season.

Current squad

Sources: Prva-HNL.hr, Sportske novosti, Sportnet.hr, 

1Played for Dinamo Zagreb in 1997–2000
2Played for Dinamo Zagreb in 1999–2003
3Played for Dinamo Zagreb in 2007–2008

Kramarić, Bručić, Ademi and Šitum loaned to NK Lokomotiva till end of the season. Morales loaned to Universidad de Chile till end of the season.

Competitions

Overall

Prva HNL

Classification

Results summary

Results by round

Results by opponent

Source: 2011–12 Prva HNL article

2011–12 Champions league

Group D

Matches

Key

Tournament
1. HNL = 2011–12 Prva HNL
Cup = 2011–12 Croatian Cup
UCL = 2011–12 UEFA Champions League
UEL = 2011–12 UEFA Europa League
Ground
H = Home
A = Away
HR = Home replacement
AR = Away replacement

Round
R1 = Round 1 (round of 32)
R2 = Round 2 (round of 16)
QF = Quarter-finals
SF = Semi-finals
F = Final
QR2 = Second Qualifying Round
QR3 = Third Qualifying Round
Play-off = Play-off Round
Group = Group Stage

Pre-season

Season friendly

Mid-season friendly

Competitive

Last updated 8 April 2012Sources: Prva-HNL.hr, Sportske novosti, Sportnet.hr, gnkdinamo.hr

Statistics

Statistics
Competitive matches only. Updated to games played 12 May 2012.

Source: Competitive matches

Transfers

In

Out

References

External links
GNK Dinamo Zagreb official website

2011-12
Croatian football clubs 2011–12 season
2011–12 UEFA Champions League participants seasons
2011-12